Grazing land may refer to: 

 For grazing of livestock: 
 Pasture
 Rangeland

See also
 Where wild herbivores graze: 
 Grassland
 Savanna
 Steppe